The Rolling Stones are an English rock band formed in 1962. They have released 25 studio albums through 2016 and recorded 422 songs. The original lineup consisted of multi-instrumentalist Brian Jones, lead vocalist Mick Jagger, guitarist Keith Richards, bass guitarist Bill Wyman, drummer Charlie Watts, and keyboardist Ian Stewart. Stewart was dismissed from the lineup in 1963 but continued to serve as their road manager and de facto keyboard player. Following Jones' dismissal in 1969, Mick Taylor took over lead guitar duties until 1974, when he quit the group over issues of songwriting credits. He was replaced by ex Faces guitarist Ronnie Wood. The band were inducted into the Rock and Roll Hall of Fame in 1989. The group continues to write, tour, and produce to this day.

Songs

See also
Jagger–Richards
The Rolling Stones discography

Notes

References

External links

 
Rolling Stones